Jackie MacMillan is an American ice hockey coach.

Career
MacMillan was the starting goalie for the Wisconsin Badgers women's ice hockey team for four seasons. She has served as an assistant coach for the Union Dutchwomen, as well as at St. Olaf College and at Shattuck-St. Mary's in Faribault, Minnesota. Later she was given the head coaching position at New England College before being given the same position at The College of St. Scholastica in 2009.

References

University of Wisconsin–Madison alumni
Wisconsin Badgers women's ice hockey players
Living people
New England College Pilgrims women's ice hockey
St. Olaf College people
1979 births
New England College people